In the theory of von Neumann algebras, the Kaplansky density theorem, due to Irving Kaplansky, is a fundamental approximation theorem. The importance and ubiquity of this technical tool led Gert Pedersen to comment in one of his books that, 
The density theorem is Kaplansky's great gift to mankind. It can be used every day, and twice on Sundays.

Formal statement
Let K− denote the strong-operator closure of a set K in B(H), the set of bounded operators on the Hilbert space H, and let (K)1 denote the intersection of K with the unit ball of B(H).
Kaplansky density theorem. In other words, .

The Kaplansky density theorem can be used to formulate some approximations with respect to the strong operator topology.

1) If h is a positive operator in (A−)1, then h is in the strong-operator closure of the set of self-adjoint operators in (A+)1, where A+ denotes the set of positive operators in A.

2) If A is a C*-algebra acting on the Hilbert space H and u is a unitary operator in A−, then u is in the strong-operator closure of the set of unitary operators in A.

In the density theorem and 1) above, the results also hold if one considers a ball of radius r > 0, instead of the unit ball.

Proof
The standard proof uses the fact that a bounded continuous real-valued function f is strong-operator continuous. In other words, for a net {aα} of self-adjoint operators in A, the continuous functional calculus a → f(a) satisfies,

in the strong operator topology. This shows that self-adjoint part of the unit ball in A− can be approximated strongly by self-adjoint elements in A. A matrix computation in M2(A) considering the self-adjoint operator with entries 0 on the diagonal and a and a* at the other positions, then removes the self-adjointness restriction and proves the theorem.

See also
 Jacobson density theorem

Notes

References
 Kadison, Richard, Fundamentals of the Theory of Operator Algebras, Vol. I : Elementary Theory, American Mathematical Society. .
 V.F.R.Jones von Neumann algebras; incomplete notes from a course.
 M. Takesaki Theory of Operator Algebras I 

Von Neumann algebras
Theorems in functional analysis